Person's Ordinary is a historic inn and tavern located at Littleton, Halifax County, North Carolina. It dates to the mid- to late-18th century, and is a 1 1/2-story frame dwelling, three bays wide and two deep, with a massive exterior stone chimney at each end.  It rests on a stone cellar, and has a modified Quaker plan.  The building housed an inn and tavern for stagecoach travelers into the 1830s and is associated with Thomas Person, one of the state's most important political leaders from 1760 to 1790.

It was listed on the National Register of Historic Places in 1973.

References

External links
A History of Littleton, North Carolina

Hotel buildings on the National Register of Historic Places in North Carolina
Buildings and structures in Halifax County, North Carolina
National Register of Historic Places in Halifax County, North Carolina